Lüder is a river of Hesse, Germany. It flows into the Fulda river northwest of Fulda town. Its source is in the upland bog of the Völzberger Köpfchen.

See also
List of rivers of Hesse

References

Rivers of Hesse
Rivers of the Vogelsberg
Rivers of Germany